The Billeaud House is a historic house located at 303 West Main Street in Broussard, Louisiana.

Built in c.1907 by Charles Billeaud, the house is a Queen Anne-Colonial Revival style residence with an Ionic front gallery and a semi-octagonal bay. The structure has large decorated dormers on three sides.

It was listed on the National Register of Historic Places in 1983.

It is one of 10 individually NRHP-listed houses in the "Broussard Multiple Resource Area", which also includes: 
Alesia House

Martial Billeaud Jr. House
Valsin Broussard House 
Comeaux House 
Ducrest Building
Janin Store 
Roy-LeBlanc House 
St. Cecilia School 
St. Julien House 
Main Street Historic District

See also
 National Register of Historic Places listings in Lafayette Parish, Louisiana

References

Houses on the National Register of Historic Places in Louisiana
Queen Anne architecture in Louisiana
Colonial Revival architecture in Louisiana
Houses completed in 1907
Lafayette Parish, Louisiana
National Register of Historic Places in Lafayette Parish, Louisiana